Konstantin Kravchuk was the defending champion but lost in the second round to Marek Jaloviec.

Guillermo García López won the title after defeating Kamil Majchrzak 6–1, 7–6(7–1) in the final.

Seeds

Draw

Finals

Top half

Bottom half

References
Main Draw
Qualifying Draw

2017 ATP Challenger Tour
2017 Singles